The  (Scottish Gaelic for 'washerwoman' or 'laundress') is a female spirit in Scottish folklore, regarded as an omen of death and a messenger from the Otherworld.

Legends
The , also known as the Washing Woman or Washer at the Ford, is seen in lonely places beside a stream or pool, washing the blood from the linen and grave-clothes of those who are about to die. Her characteristics vary depending on the locality, and differing traditions ascribe to her the powers of imparting knowledge or the granting of wishes if she is approached with caution. It is said that  (the plural of ) are the spirits of women who died giving birth and are doomed to perform their tasks until the day their lives would have normally ended. It was also believed that this fate could be avoided if all the clothing left by the deceased woman had been washed. Otherwise, she would have to finish this task after death.

On the Isles of Mull and Tiree she was said to have unusually long breasts that interfere with her washing so she throws them over her shoulders and lets them hang down her back. Those who see her must not turn away, but quietly approach from behind so that she is not aware. He should then take hold of one of her breasts, put it in his mouth, and claim to be her foster-child (see Milk kinship). She will then impart to him whatever knowledge he desires. If she says the clothing she is washing belongs to an enemy, then he can allow the washing to continue, but if it belongs to himself or any of his friends, then he can stop her from completing her task and avoid his fate.

On the Isle of Skye the bean-nighe was said to have a squat figure resembling a "small pitiful child". If a person catches her she will reveal to him his ultimate fate. She answers all his questions but he must also truthfully answer hers in return. If however the bean-nighe sees him first then he will lose the use of his limbs.

In Perthshire she was described as small and rotund and dressed in green, and can be caught by getting between her and the stream.

The  is sometimes said to sing a mournful dirge as she washes the clothing of someone who is about to meet a sudden death by violence. She is often so absorbed in her washing and singing that she can sometimes be captured. If a person can seize hold of her after a stealthy approach, then she will reveal who is about to die and will also grant three wishes. Hence, when a man would be successful in his work of some phase of his life the people would often say "Mary! She is sometimes described as having various physical defects, including having only one nostril; a large, protruding front tooth; or red webbed feet.

One popular Highland story connected with the washing of death shrouds regards the so-called "Mermaid of Loch Slin". A maiden from Cromarty was walking along a path by the side of this loch one Sabbath morning, and after turning a corner she saw a tall woman standing in the water "knocking " (clothes) on a stone with a bludgeon. On a nearby bleaching-green, she observed more than thirty smocks and shirts, all smeared with blood. Shortly following the appearance of this figure, the roof of Fearn Abbey collapsed during worship service, burying the congregation in debris and killing thirty-six people. Historically, the abbey roof did collapse in 1742, with the death toll reckoned at nearly fifty.

One folktale collected by Alexander Carmichael in the Carmina Gadelica, Vol. II, runs as follows:

Etymology

Both the Irish  and the Scottish Gaelic  (both meaning 'woman of the ', 'fairy woman' or 'woman of peace') are derived from the Old Irish , 'fairy woman': : 'woman', and : the genitive of 'fairy'.

Both are correct.

See also
 
 
 
 
 
 The

References

Aos Sí
Banshees
Fairies
Fantasy creatures
Female legendary creatures
Irish folklore
Irish legendary creatures
Scottish folklore
Scottish legendary creatures
Tuatha Dé Danann
Water spirits